Wilson Plaza West is a skyscraper in Corpus Christi, Texas, United States.

The building had originally been constructed as the Nixon building in 1927.  It consisted of 12 stories and became a center of business.  In 1947 Sam E. Wilson purchased the building. The site includes two barbershops and a mechanic.
In 1951 Mr Wilson built a 17-story office tower with a 4-story penthouse.

It was the tallest building in Corpus Christi until 1983, when the Frost Bank Building was completed.

References

Buildings and structures in Corpus Christi, Texas